Dames and Dentists is a 1920 American silent comedy film featuring Oliver Hardy.

Cast
 Jimmy Aubrey as The Husband
 Oliver Hardy (as Babe Hardy)
 Richard Smith

See also
 List of American films of 1920
 Oliver Hardy filmography

External links

1920 films
American silent short films
American black-and-white films
1920 comedy films
1920 short films
Films directed by Noel M. Smith
Silent American comedy films
American comedy short films
1920s American films